Shafiqul Islam Manik (born 22 October 1967 in Dhaka) is a Bangladeshi football coach and former national team player. He is also the former head coach of the Bangladesh national football team

Statistics

References

Living people
1967 births
People from Dhaka
Abahani Limited (Dhaka) players
Brothers Union players
Mohammedan SC (Dhaka) players
Sheikh Jamal Dhanmondi Club players
Bangladeshi football coaches
Bangladesh Football Premier League managers
Association football defenders
Asian Games competitors for Bangladesh
Bangladeshi football managers
Bangladesh national football team managers